Korostelev or Korostelyov (feminine Korosteleva or Korostelyova) is a Slavic surname. Notable people with this name include:
Elena Korosteleva, Belarusian political scientist
Július Korostelev (1923–2006), Czech footballer
Natalya Korostelyova (born 1981), Russian cross-country skier
Olga Barysheva-Korostelyova (born 1954), Russian basketball player
Olga Korosteleva, Russian-American statistician
Pavel Korostelyov (born 1978), Russian cross-country skier